Robert Lansing (October 17, 1864 – October 30, 1928) was an American lawyer and diplomat who served as Counselor to the State Department at the outbreak of World War I, and then as United States Secretary of State under President Woodrow Wilson from 1915 to 1920.  A conservative pro-business Democrat, he was a strong advocate of democracy and of the United States' role in establishing international law. He was an avowed enemy of German autocracy and Russian Bolshevism. Before U.S. involvement in the war, Lansing vigorously advocated freedom of the seas and the rights of neutral nations. He later advocated U.S. participation in World War I, negotiated the Lansing–Ishii Agreement with Japan in 1917 and was a member of the American Commission to Negotiate Peace at Paris in 1919. However, Wilson made Colonel House his chief foreign policy advisor because Lansing privately opposed much of the Treaty of Versailles and was skeptical of the Wilsonian principle of self-determination.

Career
Robert Lansing was born in Watertown, New York, the son of John Lansing (1832–1907) and Maria Lay (Dodge) Lansing. He graduated from Amherst College in 1886, studied law, and was admitted to the bar in 1889.

From then to 1907, he was a member of the law firm of Lansing & Lansing at Watertown. An authority on international law, he served as associate counsel for the United States, during the Bering Sea Arbitration from 1892–1893, as counsel for the United States Bering Sea Claims Commission in 1896–1897, as the government's lawyer before the Alaskan Boundary Tribunal in 1903, as counsel for the North Atlantic Fisheries in the Arbitration at The Hague in 1909–1910, and as agent of the United States in the American and British Arbitration in 1912–1914. In 1914 Lansing was appointed counselor to the State Department by President Woodrow Wilson. Lansing, who had argued cases before Judge Nicholas D. Yost in Watertown, was responsible for encouraging the judge's son, future Ambassador Charles W. Yost, to join the Foreign Service.

World War I
Lansing advocated "benevolent neutrality" at the start of World War I but shifted away from the ideal after increasing interference and violation of the rights of neutrals by Britain.

According to Lester H. Woolsey, a top aide in the State Department and later Lansing's law partner, Lansing had very strong views against Germany. He kept these to himself because Wilson disagreed. Lansing expressed his views by manipulating the work of the State Department to minimize conflict with Britain and maximize public awareness of Germany's faults. Woolsey states:Although the President cherished the hope that the United States would not be drawn into the war, and while this was the belief of many officials, Mr. Lansing early in July, 1915, came to the conclusion that the German ambition for world domination was the real menace of the war, particularly to democratic institutions. In order to block this German ambition, he believed that the progress of the war would eventually disclose to the American people the purposes of the German Government; that German activities in the United States and in Latin America should be carefully investigated and frustrated; that the American republics to the south should be weaned from the German influences; that friendly relations with Mexico should be maintained even to the extent of recognizing the Carranza faction; that the Danish West Indies should be acquired in order to remove the possibility of Germany's obtaining a foothold in the Caribbean by conquest of Denmark or otherwise; that the United States should enter the war if it should appear that Germany would become the victor; and that American public opinion must be awakened in preparation for this contingency. This outline of Mr. Lansing's views explains why the Lusitania dispute was not brought to the point of a break.  It also explains why, though Americans were incensed at the British interference with commerce, the controversy was kept within the arena of debate.

Following the sinking of the RMS Lusitania on 7 May 1915 by the German submarine , Lansing backed Woodrow Wilson in issuing three notes of protest to the German government. William Jennings Bryan resigned as Secretary of State following Wilson's second note, which Bryan considered too belligerent. Lansing replaced Bryan, and said in his memoirs that following the Lusitania tragedy he always had the "conviction that we would ultimately become the ally of Britain". Wilson selected Lansing as secretary because he was proficient in routine work and deficient in ideas and initiative. Unlike Bryan he lacked a political base. The result was that Wilson could be—and indeed actually was—entirely free to make all major foreign policy decisions. John Milton Cooper adds that it was one of Wilson's worst mistakes as president. Wilson told Colonel House that as president he would practically be his own Secretary of State, and "Lansing would not be troublesome by uprooting or injecting his own views."

In 1916, Lansing hired a handful of men who became the State Department's first special agents in the new Bureau of Secret Intelligence. The agents were initially used to observe the activities of the Central Powers in America and later to watch over interned German diplomats. The small group of agents hired by Lansing would eventually become the U.S. Diplomatic Security Service (DSS).

Later life
In 1919, Lansing became the nominal head of the US Commission to the Paris Peace Conference. Because he did not regard the League of Nations as essential to the peace treaty, Lansing began to fall out of favor with Wilson, who considered participation in the League of Nations to be a primary goal. During Wilson's stroke and illness, Lansing called the cabinet together for consultations on several occasions. In addition, he was the first cabinet member to suggest for Vice President Thomas R. Marshall to assume the powers of the presidency. Displeased by Lansing's independence, Edith Wilson requested Lansing's resignation. Lansing stepped down from his post on February 12, 1920.

After leaving office, Lansing resumed practicing law. He died in New York City on October 30, 1928, and was buried at Brookside Cemetery in Watertown, New York.

Personal life and family

Through his father Lansing was descended from Thomas Dudley, John Allin, Samuel Appleton and Thomas Mayhew. Through his mother he was descended from Miles Morgan, John Mason, Roger Williams, Anne Hutchinson and John Cutt. In 1890, Lansing married Eleanor Foster, the daughter of Secretary of State John W. Foster.  Eleanor's older sister Edith was the mother of John Foster Dulles, who also became Secretary of State, Allen Welsh Dulles who served as Director of Central Intelligence, and Eleanor Lansing Dulles, an economist and high level policy analyst and advisor for the State Department.

New York State Senator Robert Lansing (1799–1878) was his grandfather; Chancellor John Lansing Jr. and State Treasurer Abraham G. Lansing were his great-granduncles.

Authorship
Lansing was associate editor of the American Journal of International Law, and with Gary M. Jones was the author of Government: Its Origin, Growth, and Form in the United States (1902). He also wrote: The Big Four and Others at the Peace Conference, Boston (1921) and The Peace Negotiations: A Personal Narrative, Boston/New York (1921).

Legacy and honors
During World War II the Liberty ship  was built in Panama City, Florida, and named in his honor.

See also
 Foreign policy of the Woodrow Wilson administration

References

Further reading
 Craft, Stephen G. "John Bassett Moore, Robert Lansing, and the Shandong Question." Pacific Historical Review 66.2 (1997): 231-249. Online
 Glaser, David. "1919: William Jenkins, Robert Lansing, and the Mexican Interlude." Southwestern Historical Quarterly 74.3 (1971): 337-356. Online
 Glaser, David. Robert Lansing: A Study in Statecraft (2015).
 Hannigan, Robert E. "The New World Power." (U of Pennsylvania Press, 2013. excerpt
 Hannigan, Robert E. The Great War and American Foreign Policy, 1914-24 (2016) excerpt
 Kahle, Louis G. "Robert Lansing and the Recognition of Venustiano Carranza." Hispanic American Historical Review 38.3 (1958): 353-372. Online
 Lazo, Dimitri D. "A Question of Loyalty: Robert Lansing and the Treaty of Versailles." Diplomatic History 9.1 (1985): 35-53. [ Online]
 Seymour, Charles. "War Memoirs of Robert Lansing, Secretary of State." American Historical Review 41#3 (1936), pp. 561–563. online
 Smith, Daniel M. Robert Lansing and American Neutrality, 1914-1917 (U of California Press, 1958).
 Smith, Daniel M. "Robert Lansing and the Formulation of American Neutrality Policies, 1914-1915." Mississippi Valley Historical Review 43.1 (1956): 59-81. Online
 Smith, Daniel M. "Robert Lansing." in An Uncertain Tradition: American Secretaries of State in the Twentieth Century (1961) pp: 61+.
 Williams, Joyce G. "The Resignation of Secretary of State Robert Lansing." Diplomatic History 3.3 (1979): 337-344.
 Woolsey, Lester H. "Robert Lansing's Record as Secretary of State." Current History 29.3 (1928): 384-396. online

Primary sources
 Grenville, John Ashley Soames. "The United States decision for war, 1917: Excerpts from the manuscript diary of Robert Lansing." Culture, Theory and Critique 4.1 (1960): 59-81.
 Lansing, Robert. War Memoirs of Robert Lansing (1935) online
 Lansing, Robert. The Peace Negotiations (1921) online

External links

 Robert Lansing Papers at the Seeley G. Mudd Manuscript Library, Princeton University
 
 
 U.S. Diplomatic Security - Office of Foreign Missions (OFM)
 

1864 births
1928 deaths
United States Secretaries of State
Woodrow Wilson administration cabinet members
American legal writers
American political writers
American male non-fiction writers
Amherst College alumni
Lansing family
Dulles family
New York (state) Democrats
New York (state) lawyers
Politicians from Watertown, New York
Writers from New York (state)
20th-century American politicians
American anti-communists